Venkatapuram may refer to:

 Venkatapuram (film), 2017 Indian Telugu-language film
 Venkatapuram, Hyderabad
 Venkatapuram, Kurnool district
 Venkatapuram, Prakasam district
 Venkatapuram, Jayashankar Bhupalpally district